H.G.C. "Henk" Schulte Nordholt  (born 13 June 1953, in De Bilt) is head of research at KITLV and KITLV professor of Indonesian History at Leiden University. His focus is on Southeast Asian history, contemporary politics in Indonesia, political violence, Balinese studies and the anthropology of colonialism. He is chairman of the board of the International Institute of Asian Studies (IIAS) and Secretary of the European Association of Southeast Asian Studies (EuroSEAS).

Nordholt graduated with a degree in history from the VU University in Amsterdam in 1980. He earned his PhD in social sciences from the Free University in 1988 with a thesis on the history of the political system on the island of Bali. He taught anthropology and Asian history at the University of Amsterdam from 1985 until 2005 and was an IIAS professor of Asian History from 1999 until 2007 he was at the Erasmus University in Rotterdam.

Nordholdt leads the research program ‘Governance, Markets and Citizens (2013–2017)’ sponsored by the Scientific Program Indonesia – Netherlands (SPIN) and is involved in the ‘Dutch Military Operations in Indonesia, 1945–1950′ program.

References

1953 births
Living people
Indonesianists
Academic staff of Erasmus University Rotterdam
Academic staff of Leiden University
Vrije Universiteit Amsterdam alumni
Academic staff of Vrije Universiteit Amsterdam
People from De Bilt